The Kvinde 1. division or Danish Women's 1st Division is the second-highest division of women's football in Denmark.

Format
There are 16 teams competing the 1st Division, divided into two groups of eight teams. They are divided into an East group and a West group, every season. The teams is divided from which location in the country, they are from. The two highest ranked teams in each group, will qualified to the Elitedivisionen Qualification round, were they play in a group of six teams. The two highest ranked teams will qualified to the Elitedivisionen, the upcoming season. The teams who failed to qualified, will play a qualification stage with the teams from the Denmark Series.

Teams
Teams of the 2020–21 season.
Group 1
B.93
FC Damsø
FB
Sundby BK
Østerbro IF

Group 2
BSF
Fredensborg BI
Herlufsholm GF
Næsby BK
Solrød

Group 3
Aarhus 1900
AGF II
ASA
Odense Q
Varde IF

Group 4
Aalborg Freja
Fortuna Hjørring II
JAI
Romalt IF
Vildbjerg SF

External links
Official website

Second level women's association football leagues in Europe
Women
Sports leagues established in 2014
2
2
Professional sports leagues in Denmark